Elisabeta Bostan (born 1 March 1931) is a Romanian film director and screenwriter. She directed 25 films between 1956 and 1991.

Biography
She then went to Bucharest, where she enrolled in the Institute of Theatre and Film I.L. Caragiale, graduating in 1954. She made her debut in 1958 with two short films, "Trei jocuri românești" and "Cloșca cu puii de aur". Bostan taught at the Institute of Theatre and Film, where she served for a period as Dean.

She received prizes at festivals in Moscow, Tehran, Cannes, Venice, Gijón, and Tours. In 2009 she received the Gopo Award for Lifetime Achievement.

Filmography

Culegere de dansuri românești (1956) 
Trei jocuri românești (1958)
Dansul 'Cloșca cu puii de aur' (1958)
Cloșca cu pui (1958) 
Hora (1959) 
 (1962)
Năică și peștișorul (1963)
 (1964)
Pupăza din tei (1965) 
 (1966)
 (1967) 
 (1967) 
Tinerețe fără bătrânețe (1969)
Veronica (1972)
Veronica se întoarce (1973)
Mama (1976)
 (1981)
 (1982)
 (1983) – TV series
 (1985)
 (1987)
 (1988)
 (1989) 
 (1990)
 (1991)

See also
 List of Romanian film and theatre directors
 List of Romanian films

References

External links

1931 births
Living people
Romanian film directors
Romanian women film directors
Romanian screenwriters
People from Buhuși
Caragiale National University of Theatre and Film alumni
Romanian women academics
Romanian university and college faculty deans